Pseudophaloe triangulata is a moth in the family Erebidae. It was described by Paul Dognin in 1919. It is found in Bolivia.

References

Natural History Museum Lepidoptera generic names catalog

Moths described in 1919
Pseudophaloe